The Grudge 3 is a 2009 American supernatural horror film and the third installment in The Grudge original trilogy. Toby Wilkins, who had previously directed the successful film Splinter and the short film series Tales from the Grudge, took Takashi Shimizu's place as director who later served as executive producer, while Brad Keene replaced Stephen Susco as screenwriter.

The film stars Johanna Braddy, Gil McKinney, Emi Ikehata, Jadie Rose Robson, Beau Mirchoff and Shawnee Smith, with a special appearance by Matthew Knight (from The Grudge 2). Aiko Horiuchi and Shimba Tsuchiya plays Kayako and Toshio in the film, with Takashi Matsuyama only reappearing as Takeo Saeki via archive footage.

Unlike the previous American films that were both rated PG-13, The Grudge 3 was given an R rating because of its graphic bloody violence, gore and language. The film features a linear plotline unlike all of its predecessors, which used nonlinear sequences of events for their respective plots and subplots.

The Grudge 3 was released on straight-to-DVD on May 12, 2009, by Sony Pictures Home Entertainment, with the theatrical release occurring internationally. The film received mostly negative reviews.

Plot
After the events of the second film, Jake Kimble is under the care of Dr. Sullivan in an asylum. He is locked in his room following several escape attempts and is attacked by Kayako. The attack is seen on security cameras, although her ghost cannot be seen, and Jake is dead by the time Sullivan arrives with a security officer. News of the incident reaches Tokyo, Japan as Kayako's younger sister Naoko, aware of her older sister's haunting, travels to Chicago, Illinois, USA.

The apartment building where Jake lived is under renovation. Of the few residents who remain, some glimpse Toshio. Several people associated with the cursed apartment begin to die, including Renee's mute daughter Brenda, Rose's babysitter and family friend Gretchen, Lisa's boyfriend Andy, and Max's boss Mr. Praski. Sullivan, while investigating Jake's death, speaks with the residents and finds that others have seen the little boy of whom Jake spoke. Sullivan digs more into the information and is killed by Kayako.

Naoko moves in while the ghosts of Kayako and Toshio kill various residents and anyone associated with them. She tells the landlord's family that the curse now resides in the apartment and tries to convince them to participate in an exorcism. The landlord's sister, Lisa, refuses to cooperate but reconsiders when she realizes that her brother, Max, is possessed by Takeo's spirit, and the source of the curse. Naoko warns that the ceremony must not be interrupted and tells Lisa and Max's sister, Rose, that she must drink Kayako's blood. Lisa refuses. The possessed Max realizes Naoko's attempts and kills her. Lisa is chased by Kayako until, just as the croaking onryō is about to kill Lisa, Rose drinks Kayako's blood which causes her curse to disappear.

Max, who has been exorcised of Takeo's evil possession upon Kayako's banishment, stares in horror at the body of Naoko, but her murder has begun a new curse. Naoko's ghost attacks and kills him. The film ends with Kayako shown to have possessed Rose.

Cast

 Johanna Braddy as Lisa Morisson, a young woman who plans to move to New York and pursue a fashion career.
 Gil McKinney as Max Morrison, Lisa and Rose's anxious older brother, who is in charge of the apartments.
 Emi Ikehata as Naoko Kawamata, Kayako's younger sister, who holds the secret to ending the curse.
 Jadie Rose Hobson as Rose Morrison, Lisa and Max's sister, who suffers from severe asthma attacks.
 Shawnee Smith as Dr. Francine Sullivan, a doctor who works at the mental hospital and Jake's caretaker.
 Marina Sirtis as Gretchen, a painter and Rose's frequent babysitter.
 Beau Mirchoff as Andy, Lisa's boyfriend
 Matthew Knight as Jake Kimble, the traumatized young boy and sole survivor of The Grudge 2.
 Aiko Horiuchi as Kayako Saeki, a ghost who is bent on killing anyone she sees.
 Shimba Tsuchiya as Toshio Saeki, a ghost that occupies the house.
 Michael McCoy as Mr. Praski, Max's boss.
 Takatsuna Mukai as Daisuke, Naoko's husband
 Laura Giosh as Renee, a tenant who moves out with her daughter Brenda after the Kimble family deaths
 Mihaela Nankova as Brenda, the frightened daughter of Renee

Takako Fuji, Takashi Matsuyama, Kim Miyori, Yuya Ozeki, Ohga Tanaka, Masanobu Yada, Nahana and Kyoka Takizawa reprise their roles from The Grudge and The Grudge 2 via archival footage and stills.

Production

Development
During post-production of The Grudge 2, Takashi Shimizu discussed ideas of creating another sequel, saying: "During the script meeting, Our ideas didn't go anywhere good, and we couldn't come up with anything interesting to stop the curse, so if that's the case, I would rather just go for something that could never be stopped. But who knows, maybe something can be stopped in The Grudge 3."

Pre-production
In the 2006 Comic Con, Sony officially announced plans of creating the sequel. Shimizu revealed he was offered the chance to direct the sequel but took on the role of producer instead.

Casting
The film put out a casting call for new actors to play Kayako and Toshio, as Takako Fuji (Kayako) and Ohga Tanaka (Toshio) passed on the opportunity. Shawnee Smith was cast in the film. Emiko Koizumi auditioned for the role of Naoki (as she was originally named in the script before she was called Naoko), but was beaten out by Emi Ikehata, in her first major motion picture after having only done student films and Japanese television.

Filming
Principal photography began in the spring-2008 and ended that same month in Sofia, Bulgaria.

Release

Home media
The DVD release was originally scheduled for March 24, 2009, but was delayed until May 12, 2009, due to the Blu-ray release of the first film. It was issued in 1.85:1 anamorphic widescreen with an English Dolby Digital 5.1 surround track. Two featurettes appear: "Tokyagoaria" documents how the Bulgarian location was made to look like Tokyo and Chicago, and "The Curse Continues" shows how the film ties into the previous two. Three deleted scenes also are included.

A Blu-ray version of the film has yet to be released in the US. A Region Free United Kingdom Blu-ray was released on June 1, 2009.

Theatrical
Though the film was released straight-to-video in the US, it did receive a theatrical release internationally in countries such as Mexico, Ecuador, Peru and South Korea, grossing a total of $1.8 million.

Reception
Bloody Disgusting awarded the film two and a half skulls, feeling it lackluster, and saying "watching The Grudge 3 is like eating the generic brand of your favorite cereal, you can try to tell yourself all day that its just as good as the real thing, but inside, deep inside, you know it tastes different." Comingsoon.net found the film "dull" and complained that even the ending offered no answers. Cinefantastique Online slammed the film calling it "such a dismally spiritless affair that it almost seems deliberately designed to make the disappointing THE GRUDGE 2 look good by comparison."

Sequel

A new installment, simply titled The Grudge, was directed by Nicolas Pesce. Originally announced as a reboot, the film is a sidequel, set during and after the events of the first three The Grudge films. Andrea Riseborough stars in the film as a young mother and detective, named Muldoon. The film was released on January 3, 2020, featuring the characters of Kayako and Toshio in cameo appearances.

See also
 List of ghost films

References

External links
 
 
 

2009 direct-to-video films
2009 films
2009 horror films
American ghost films
American haunted house films
American supernatural horror films
Asian-American horror films
Direct-to-video sequel films
Films about child death
Films about curses
Films about spirit possession
Films directed by Toby Wilkins
Films set in 2006
Films set in apartment buildings
Films set in Chicago
Films set in Tokyo
Films shot in Bulgaria
Ghost House Pictures films
Sony Pictures direct-to-video films
Stage 6 Films films
The Grudge (film series)
2000s English-language films
2000s American films